The de Havilland DH.91 Albatross was a four-engined British transport aircraft of the 1930s. A total of seven aircraft were built between 1938–39.

Development
The DH.91 was designed in 1936 by A. E. Hagg to Air Ministry specification 36/35 for a transatlantic mail plane.

The aircraft was notable for the ply-balsa-ply sandwich construction of its fuselage, later used in the de Havilland Mosquito bomber. Another unique feature was a cooling system for the air-cooled engines that allowed nearly ideal streamlining of the engine mounting. The first Albatross flew on 20 May 1937. The second prototype broke in two during overload tests but was repaired with minor reinforcement. The first and second prototypes were operated by Imperial Airways.

Although designed as a mailplane, a version to carry 22 passengers was developed; the main differences being extra windows and the replacement of split flaps with slotted flaps. Five examples formed the production order delivered in 1938/1939. When war was declared all seven aircraft were operating from Bristol/Whitchurch to Lisbon and Shannon.

Operational history

As normal for the Imperial Airways fleet of the time, all were given names starting with the same letter, and the first aircraft's name was also used as a generic description for the type overall, as "Frobisher Class". This tradition, which came from a maritime and railway background of classes of ships and locomotives, lasted well into postwar days with BOAC and BEA.

The first delivery to Imperial Airways was the 22-passenger DH.91 Frobisher in October 1938. The five passenger-carrying aircraft were operated on routes from Croydon to Paris, Brussels and Zurich. After test flying was completed, the two prototypes were delivered to Imperial Airways as long-range mail carriers. The only significant season of their operation was the summer of 1939, when they were the main type on the two-hourly London Croydon-to-Paris Le Bourget passenger route.

With the onset of World War II, the Royal Air Force considered their range and speed useful for courier flights between Great Britain and Iceland, and the two mail planes were pressed into service with 271 Squadron in September 1940, operating between Prestwick and Reykjavik, but both were destroyed in landing accidents in Reykjavík within the space of 9 months: Faraday in 1941 and Franklin in 1942.

The five passenger aircraft were used by Imperial Airways, (BOAC from September 1940) on Bristol–Lisbon and Bristol–Shannon routes from Bristol (Whitchurch) Airport.

Frobisher was destroyed during a German air raid on Whitchurch in 1940,, Fingal was destroyed in a crash-landing, following a fuel pipe failure in 1940 at Pucklechurch and Fortuna crashed near Shannon Airport in 1943. The latter accident was found to be due to deterioration of the aircraft's plywood wing structures. In view of the two surviving aircraft's vulnerability to similar problems, and for lack of spares parts, Falcon and Fiona were scrapped in September 1943.

Aircraft
Faraday
Mail-carrier variant was delivered to Imperial Airways in August 1939 as Faraday and registered G-AEVV. It was transferred to BOAC when it was formed in 1940 but was impressed into Royal Air Force service with serial number AX903 for operation by No. 271 Squadron RAF. It was destroyed in a landing accident at Reykjavik on 11 August 1941.
Franklin
Mail-carrier variant was delivered to BOAC as Franklin and registered G-AEVW. Impressed into Royal Air Force Service with the serial number AX904 for operation by 271 Squadron. It was destroyed when the landing gear collapsed on landing at Reykjavik on 7 April 1942.
Frobisher
Passenger variant was registered G-AFDI and delivered to Imperial Airways (later BOAC) as Frobisher in 1938. It was destroyed on the ground during a German air attack on Whitchurch Airport on 20 December 1940.
Falcon
Passenger variant was registered G-AFDJ and delivered to Imperial Airways (later BOAC) as Falcon in 1938. It was scrapped in September 1943.
Fortuna
Passenger variant was registered G-AFDK and delivered to Imperial Airways (later BOAC) as Fortuna in 1939. Destroyed in a crash landing near Shannon Airport, Ireland on 16 July 1943.
Fingal
Passenger variant was registered G-AFDL and delivered to Imperial Airways (later BOAC) as Fingal in 1939. Destroyed in a crash landing near Pucklechurch, Gloucestershire, England on 6 October 1940.
Fiona
Passenger variant was registered G-AFDM and delivered to Imperial Airways (later BOAC) as Fiona in 1939. It was scrapped in September 1943.

A 1/10 scale model of the Albatross owned by British Airways was found in a crate at Croydon in the 1990s and is on display in the heritage museum at Speedbird House.

Operators

 Imperial Airways which was reorganised as British Overseas Airways Corporation received all seven aircraft.
 Royal Air Force
 No. 271 Squadron RAF operated two aircraft taken over from BOAC.

Specifications (DH.91)

See also

References

Notes

Citations

Bibliography

 

Albatross
1930s British airliners
Four-engined tractor aircraft
Low-wing aircraft
Aircraft first flown in 1937
Four-engined piston aircraft